Franklin Clay Coleman (born 12 March 1970) is a Caymanian footballer who plays as a goalkeeper. He has represented the Cayman Islands at full international level.

References

Association football goalkeepers
Living people
1970 births
Caymanian footballers
Cayman Islands international footballers
George Town SC players